Carmichael Park is a major  park in Carmichael, California, an unincorporated suburb of Sacramento, California. The park includes 5 ballfields, 6 tennis courts and a dog park. The Community Clubhouse, Veterans' Memorial Building, the  Daniel Bishop Memorial Pavilion for the Performing Arts, and the Great Wall of Carmichael are all located within the park.

References

External links
http://carmichaelpark.com/carmichael-park

Carmichael, California
Parks in Sacramento County, California
Municipal parks in California